Kanwal Naz (born 25 December 1989) is a Pakistani former cricketer who played as a slow left-arm orthodox bowler. She appeared in three One Day Internationals and two Twenty20 Internationals for Pakistan in 2010. She played domestic cricket for Karachi and Zarai Taraqiati Bank Limited.

Career

Domestic career
In the final of the 2005 National Women's Cricket Championship, Naz scored 54, helping her side Karachi to the title and received the Player of the Match award.

One Day International
Naz made her One Day International debut against Ireland women's cricket team on 6 October 2010.

Twenty20 International
Naz made her Twenty20 International debut against Ireland on 16 October 2010. Naz was selected in the Pakistan squad for the 2010 Asian Games in China, but didn't play a match.

References

External links
 
 

1989 births
Living people
Cricketers from Karachi
Pakistani women cricketers
Pakistan women One Day International cricketers
Pakistan women Twenty20 International cricketers
Karachi women cricketers
Zarai Taraqiati Bank Limited women cricketers